Mrs. Gibbons' Boys is a black and white 1962 British comedy film directed by Max Varnel and starring Kathleen Harrison, Lionel Jeffries and Diana Dors. It is based on the play Mrs. Gibbons' Boys by Joseph Stein and Will Glickman; and was released in the UK as the bottom half of a double bill with Constantine and the Cross (1961).

Plot
An ageing widow finally finds new love and happiness; but matters are complicated when her two convict sons escape from prison and beg her to hide them.

Cast
 Kathleen Harrison as Mrs Gibbons
 Lionel Jeffries as Lester Gibbons
 Diana Dors as Myra
 John Le Mesurier as Cole
 Frederick Bartman as Mike Gibbons
 David Lodge a sFrank Gibbons
 Dick Emery as Woodrow
 Eric Pohlmann as Morelli
 William Kerwin as Matthew
 Milo O'Shea as Horse
 Peter Hempson as Ronnie
 Penny Morrell as  Pearl
 Nancy Nevinson as Mrs Morelli
 Mark Singleton as PC
 Tony Hilton as Dustcart driver

Production
Diana Dors was living in Los Angeles but returned to England to make the film.

References

External links

1962 films
1962 comedy films
Films shot at Associated British Studios
Films directed by Max Varnel
British comedy films
British films based on plays
1960s English-language films
1960s British films